Sha'reff Rashad, Jr. (born October 6, 1986) is a former American football safety. He was signed by the New York Giants as an undrafted free agent in 2009. He played college football at UCF.  In 2012, Sha'reff was signed as a DB by the Utah Blaze, an Arena Football team.

He also played for the Washington Redskins.

References

External links
New York Giants bio
UCF Knights bio

1986 births
Living people
Episcopal School of Jacksonville alumni
Players of American football from Jacksonville, Florida
American football safeties
UCF Knights football players
New York Giants players
People from Summerville, South Carolina
Players of American football from South Carolina
Utah Blaze players